City Under Siege may refer to:

 City Under Siege (album), a 2000 album by E.S.G.
 City Under Siege (1974 film), a 1974 Italian crime film
 City Under Siege (2010 film), a 2010 Hong Kong science fiction action film 
 ESWAT: City Under Siege, a 1990 side scrolling platform video game
 A City Under Siege: Tales of the Iran–Iraq War
 Police Academy 6: City Under Siege, a 1989 comedy film, part of the Police Academy series